Violation or violations may refer to:

 Violation (basketball), the most minor class of an illegal action in basketball
 Violation (album), a 1977 album by American hard rock band Starz
 Violation (film), a 2020 Canadian horror film
 Violations (Star Trek: The Next Generation), an episode of the science fiction television series Star Trek: The Next Generation

See also